The Parnell Baths are a historic swimming pool in Parnell, Auckland. The pools feature the largest saltwater swimming pool in New Zealand, originally filling with seawater from the Waitematā Harbour. In the 1950s, the pool complex was redeveloped into the Lido style popular in the United Kingdom, by Hungarian architect Tibor Donner.

History 

After major reclamation works along the Auckland waterfront, many of the beaches residents had traditionally used for bathing in the 19th century were no longer accessible. In 1912, a decision was made to create a saltwater pool complex at Parnell. Construction on the baths began in 1913, and the pools were opened on 7 March 1914. The poolswere originally only accessible by a narrow stairway down the cliff face from Point Resolution. The Parnell Baths were originally seawater, being filled when Judges Bay was at high tide.

In 1923, a 1.5 metre springboard was added to the pools. In 1926, a children's pool was added to the complex, and in the following year, the bottom of the pool was concreted.

Between 1926 and 1932, Tamaki Drive was constructed through Hobson Bay, closing off the baths from the sea. During this period, pipes were installed to better fill the baths with seawater, however the sanitation plant at Ōkahu Bay caused the water quality to worsen. This improved in 1939, when water purification plants were installed. From 1944, the Auckland Council began a land reclamation project on Point Resolution, in order to construct an access road to the baths.

In 1954, the pools were renovated in a Lido style by Hungarian architect Tibor Donner, featuring a two-storey building to replace the changing sheds, and a mosaic by New Zealand artist James Turkington. Between 2002 and 2003, the pools were upgraded after falling attendance in the 1990s, becoming a modern-style fitness centre.

For the facility's centenary in 2014, the book Parnell Baths: a Jewel in Auckland's Crown was commissioned by Parnell Heritage and the Waitematā Local Board, detailing the site's social history.

After the effects of the 2023 North Island floods, the pools were closed due to cliff instability.

References 

1910s architecture in New Zealand
1914 establishments in New Zealand
Buildings and structures completed in 1914
Buildings and structures in Auckland
Lidos
Parnell, New Zealand
Swimming venues in New Zealand